Reina de corazones may refer to:
Reina de corazones (American TV series)
Reina de corazones (Venezuelan TV series)
Reina de Corazones (album), a compilation album by Alejandra Guzmán